Crawfish Fiesta is an album recorded in 1979 by Professor Longhair during his revival period only months before his death in January 1980. It was released by Alligator Records in 1980. It features Dr. John, who reprised his original role as guitarist in Longhair's band, Johnny Vidacovich on drums, Tony Dagradi and Andrew Kaslow on sax, and Longhair's long time conga player Alfred "Uganda" Roberts. The album was recorded at the Sea-Saint Studios in New Orleans and it was co-produced by Kaslow, his wife Allison and Bruce Iglauer. It won the first W.C. Handy Blues Album of the Year award in 1980. It was also voted as one of the Top 10 Albums of the Year by The New York Times.

On October 16, 2012, Alligator Records reissued the album on vinyl with one previously unreleased bonus track, a cover  Percy Mayfield's "River's Invitation" which was recorded during rehearsal of the recording session of this album

Track listing 
All tracks composed by Roy Byrd; except where indicated
 "Big Chief" (Earl King; Ulis Gaines, Wardell Quezergue) – 3:13
 "Her Mind is Gone"  – 4:23
 "Something on Your Mind" (Big Jay McNeely)  – 4:10
 "You're Driving Me Crazy"  – 2:34
 "Red Beans" (McKinley Morganfield) – 4:09
 "Willie Fugal's Blues"  – 2:03
 "It's My Fault Darling" (Miles Grayson, Lermon Horton)  – 4:54
 "In the Wee Wee Hours"  – 3:23
 "Cry to Me" (Bert Russell) – 3:35
 "Bald Head"  – 2:58
 "Whole Lotta Lovin'" (Dave Bartholomew, Fats Domino) – 3:46
 "Crawfish Fiesta"  – 3:10
 "River's Invitation" (Percy Mayfield) (bonus rehearsal track, 2012) – 3:14

Personnel 
 Professor Longhair - vocals, piano
 Dr. John - guitar
 Tony Dagradi - tenor saxophone, horn arrangements
 Andrew Kaslow - tenor saxophone, horn arrangements
 Jim Moore - baritone saxophone
 Alfred "Uganda" Roberts - conga
 Johnny Vidacovich - drums
 David Lee Watson - bass
 Mac Rebennack - assistant producer

References 

1980 albums
Professor Longhair albums
Albums produced by Bruce Iglauer
Albums published posthumously
Alligator Records albums